Crematogaster coriaria is a species of ant in tribe Crematogastrini. It was described by Mayr in 1872.

References

coriaria
Insects described in 1872